Eizia is a monotypic genus of flowering plants in the family Rubiaceae. The genus contains only one species, viz. Eizia mexicana, which is found in Chiapas and Guatemala.

References

External links
Eizia in the World Checklist of Rubiaceae

Monotypic Rubiaceae genera
Hamelieae